Javier Alejandro "Javi" Forján Gutiérrez (born 5 May 1995) is a Spanish footballer who plays for Xerez CD, on loan from Linense, as a forward.

Club career
Born in La Barca de la Florida, Jerez de la Frontera, Cádiz, Andalusia, Forján was a Xerez CD youth graduate. On 8 June 2013, while still a youth, he made his first team debut by starting and scoring the first in a 2–1 Segunda División home win against FC Barcelona B, as his side was already relegated.

Forján left the club in October 2013, and subsequently signed for Arcos CF in Tercera División. The following 6 July he joined fellow league team San Fernando CD, but returned to his previous club on 16 January 2015 after terminating his contract.

On 9 July 2015, Forján agreed to a deal with Atlético Sanluqueño CF, still in the fourth division. On 5 August of the following year, after a short spell back at Arcos, he moved to UB Lebrijana.

In July 2017 Forjá signed with Albacete Balompié, being assigned to the reserves still in the fourth tier. He made his first team debut the following 14 January, coming on as a late substitute for Jérémie Bela in a 2–1 home win against Granada CF for the second level championship.

References

External links

1995 births
Living people
Footballers from Jerez de la Frontera
Spanish footballers
Association football forwards
Segunda División players
Tercera División players
Xerez CD footballers
Arcos CF players
San Fernando CD players
Atlético Sanluqueño CF players
Atlético Albacete players
Albacete Balompié players
UD Los Barrios footballers
Real Balompédica Linense footballers